Chaenactis parishii is a species of flowering plant in the daisy family known by the common name Parish's chaenactis.

Distribution
It is native to the Peninsular Ranges of southern California (San Diego County + western Riverside County) and northern Baja California, where it grows in chaparral habitat.

Description
Chaenactis parishii is a subshrub producing  a number of erect stems up to 60 centimeters  (24 inches) tall which are covered in a white feltlike coat of hairs. The woolly leaves are a few centimeters long and divided into many small lobes. The inflorescence bears flower heads on a tall, erect peduncle. The flower head is lined with grayish woolly phyllaries and contains many white or pink-tinted flowers. The fruit is an achene with a pappus of scales.

References

External links
Jepson Manual Treatment - Chaenactis parishii
United States Department of Agriculture Plants Profile; Chaenactis parishii

parishii
Flora of California
Plants described in 1885
Flora of Baja California